Henderson New Star was established in April 2009 when Henderson Group acquired New Star Asset Management and rebranded its UK retail business. Henderson New Star was rebranded Henderson Global Investors in April 2010.

It manages a various funds with particular strengths in equities, fixed income, commercial property, multi-manager and sustainable and responsible investing (SRI).

Its fund managers included Bill McQuaker, Richard Pease, John Pattullo and James Gledhill.

The company merged with US-domiciled Janus Capital Group in 2017 to form Janus Henderson

References

External links
 

Investment management companies of the United Kingdom
2017 mergers and acquisitions